Alosa is a genus of fish,  the river herrings, in the  family Clupeidae. Along with other genera in the subfamily Alosinae, they are generally known as shads. They are distinct from other herrings by having a deeper body and spawning in rivers. Several species can be found on both sides of the Atlantic Ocean and the Mediterranean Sea. Also, several taxa occur in the brackish-water Caspian Sea and the Black Sea basin. Many are found in fresh water during spawning and some are only found in landlocked fresh water.

Fossil record
These fishes lived from the Eocene to Quaternary (from 55 million years ago to now). Fossils have been found in Canada, the United States, Greece, Kazakhstan, Azerbaijan, Hungary, Romania, and Italy.

Appearance
Alosa species are generally dark on the back and top of the head, with blue, violet, or greenish tints. Some can be identified as having a grey or green back. Spots are commonly found behind the head, and the fins may vary from species to species or individually. Most species of Alosa weigh  or less, with A. pontica and A. fallax weighing up to 2 kg, and A. alosa can exceed 3-4 kg.

Biology
Shads are thought to be unique among the fishes in having evolved an ability to detect ultrasound (at frequencies above 20 kHz, which is the limit of human hearing).  This was first discovered by fisheries biologists studying a type of shad known as blueback herring, and was later verified in laboratory studies of hearing in American shad. This ability is thought to help them avoid dolphins that find prey using echolocation. Alosa species are generally pelagic. They are mostly anadromous or semianadromous with the exception of strictly freshwater landlocked species. Alosa species are generally migratory and schooling fish. Males usually mature about a year before females; they spawn in the late spring to summer. Most individuals die shortly after spawning. Alosa species seemingly can change readily to adapt to their environments, as species are found in a wide range of temperatures and waters.

Lifecycle and reproduction
As Alosa species are generally anadromous, they face various obstacles to survival. They may have to pass through numerous barriers and waters to get to either their spawning grounds or normal habitats (the sea in most cases). Estuaries are a major factor in numerous Alosa species' migrations. Estuaries can be highly variable and complex environments contributing to fluctuating biological interactions, with shifts in osmolarity, food sources, predators, etc. Since many adult Alosa species die after spawning, only the young generally  migrate to the sea from the spawning grounds. Duration of migration varies among fish, but can greatly affect survival.

Reproduction varies by species. Studies done on Alosa in Iranian waters have shown that spawning varies in time, place, and temperature of the waters they inhabit. Fecundity may also vary. Species are known to spawn as early as April or as late as August. Temperatures range from about 11 to 27 °C.  Fecundity can range from 20,000 to 312,000 eggs. Eggs are pelagic. Geography and temperature are important environmental factors in egg and young-of-year development.

The lifespan of Alosa species can be up to 10 years, but this is generally uncommon, as many die after spawning.

Systematics 

The systematics and distribution of Alosa shads are complex. The genus inhabits a wide range of habitats, and many taxa are migratory. A few forms are landlocked, including one from Killarney in Ireland, two from lakes in northern Italy, and two in Greece.  Several species are native to the Black and Caspian Seas. Alosa species of the Caspian are systemically characterized by the number of rakers on the first gill arch. They are classified as being "multirakered", "medium-rakered", or "oligorakered". The multirakered are primarily plankton feeders, the oligorakered have large rakers and are predators, and the medium-rakered generally consume a mixed diet. Most current species of the genus Alosa in North America can be found in Florida, whereas the distribution of most of them is broader.

Morphology is notoriously liable to adapt to changing food availability in these fish. Several taxa seem to have evolved quite recently, making molecular analyses difficult. In addition, hybridization may be a factor in shad phylogeny. Nonetheless, some trends are emerging. The North American species except the American shad A. sapidissima can probably be separated in a subgenus Pomolobus. Conversely, the proposed genus (or subgenus) Caspialosa for the Caspian Sea forms is rejected due to paraphyly.

Species by geographical origin

North America
 Alosa aestivalis (Mitchill, 1814) (blueback herring) 
 Alosa alabamae D. S. Jordan and Evermann, 1896 (Alabama shad)
 Alosa chrysochloris (Rafinesque, 1820) (skipjack shad) 
 Alosa mediocris (Mitchill, 1814) (hickory shad) 
 Alosa pseudoharengus (A. Wilson, 1811) (alewife) 
 Alosa sapidissima (A. Wilson, 1811) (American shad)

Western Europe and the Mediterranean
 Alosa agone (Scopoli, 1786) (agone)
 Alosa algeriensis Regan, 1916 (North African shad)
 Alosa alosa (Linnaeus, 1758) (allis shad) 
 Alosa fallax (Lacépède, 1803) (twait shad)
 Alosa killarnensis Regan, 1916 (Killarney shad)

Caspian Sea, Black Sea, the Balkans
 Alosa braschnikowi (Borodin, 1904) (Caspian marine shad)
 Alosa caspia (Eichwald, 1838)
 A. c. caspia (Eichwald, 1838) (Caspian shad)
 A. c. knipowitschi (Iljin, 1927) (Enzeli shad)
 A. c. persica (Iljin, 1927) (Astrabad shad)
 Alosa curensis (Suvorov, 1907) (Kura shad)
 Alosa immaculata E. T. Bennett, 1835 (Pontic shad)
 Alosa kessleri (Grimm, 1887) (Caspian anadromous shad)
 Alosa macedonica (Vinciguerra, 1921) (Macedonia shad)
 Alosa maeotica (Grimm, 1901) (Black Sea shad)
 Alosa saposchnikowii (Grimm, 1887) (Saposhnikovi shad)
 Alosa sphaerocephala (L. S. Berg, 1913) (Agrakhan shad)
 Alosa tanaica (Grimm, 1901) (Azov shad)
 Alosa vistonica Economidis and Sinis, 1986 (Thracian shad)
 Alosa volgensis (L. S. Berg, 1913) (Volga shad)

Recreational fishing

Commercial fishing

Management
Shad populations have been in decline for years due to spawning areas blocked by dams, habitat destruction, pollution, and overfishing. Management of shad has called for more conservative regulations, and policies to help the species have lower fishing mortality.

Political significance
Shad serve a peculiar symbolic role in Virginia state politics. On the year of every gubernatorial election, would-be candidates, lobbyists, campaign workers, and reporters gather in the town of Wakefield, Virginia, for shad planking. American shad served as the focal point of John McPhee's book The Founding Fish.

Culinary use

The roe, or more properly the entire engorged uterus of the American shad—filled with ripening eggs, sautéed in clarified butter and garnished with parsley and a slice of lemon—is considered a great delicacy, and commands high prices when available.

See also
The Shad Foundation

References

External links 

 Tastes of the Region: Shad An article celebrating shad's cultural importance to the Hudson Valley
 Lambertville NJ Shad Festival
 Science Cheerleader - Shad: Our Pollution vs. Their Resolution.

 
Commercial fish
Extant Eocene first appearances
Marine fish genera
Ray-finned fish genera